Ronald Keven Oxenham (28 July 1891 – 16 August 1939) was an Australian cricketer who played in seven Test matches from 1928 to 1931.

Early life
Ron was born to Augustus Emmanuel and Elizabeth Oxenham (née Perry) at the Brisbane suburb of Nundah in late July 1891.

First-class career
Oxenham (aged 20) debuted for Queensland in a match at the SCG against New South Wales in November 1911. 
After a long career, he played his last first-class match (aged 45) against South Australia in February 1937.

References

1891 births
1939 deaths
Australia Test cricketers
Queensland cricketers
Australian cricketers
Cricketers from Brisbane
Burials at Nudgee Cemetery